Brigadier General Alexander Colin Johnston DSO & Bar, MC (26 January 1884 – 27 December 1952) was an English first-class cricketer and British Army officer. Johnston was a right-handed batsman who was a leg break bowler. Johnston also occasionally played as a wicketkeeper.

Early life
Born in Derby, Johnston was educated at Winchester College, where he represented the college cricket team. From there Johnston went to Sandhurst and he also spent a year as a cowboy in Colorado and New Mexico before being commissioned into the Worcestershire Regiment on 4 November 1903.

First-class cricket career
Johnston made his first-class debut for Hampshire in the 1902 County Championship against Surrey. Johnston played 107 matches for Hampshire before the First World War, with Johnston's most successful seasons with the bat coming in 1910 when he scored 1,158 runs at a batting average of 36.18, with seven half centuries and a single century score of 130; and in 1,044 runs at an average of 54.94 and a career high score of 175 against Warwickshire. In addition to representing Hampshire before the war, Johnston also played for the Marylebone Cricket Club in two pre-war first-class matches against Nottinghamshire and Leicestershire, both matches coming in 1911. Also in 1911, Johnston played a single match for the Gentlemen in the 1911 Gentlemen v Players fixture, representing them once more in the 1912 fixture. In the 1914 season, which was cut short by the First World War, Johnston played a single match for the Army against the Royal Navy. Johnston's final first-class match for Hampshire before the war came against Surrey at Portsmouth.

First World War service
Johnston fought in the First World War, serving on the Western Front with the original Expeditionary Force, being wounded four times and rising to the rank of brigadier general. Initially Johnston served as signals officer for 7th Infantry Brigade. He went on to serve in that capacity with 3rd Division before becoming, in turn, brigade major, commanding officer 10th Battalion Cheshire Regiment and finally officer commanding 126 Infantry Brigade. Johnston took part in the engagements at Mons, Le Cateau and the subsequent retreat and advance to the Aisne. In 1916 whilst commanding the 10th Battalion Cheshire Regiment he was awarded the Distinguished Service Order (DSO) for his actions at the Battle of the Somme. A year later in 1917 he was awarded a bar to his DSO for his actions at Ypres. During the course of the war he was mentioned in despatches no fewer than five times; and in 1916 he was awarded the French Croix de Guerre. Johnston wrote a diary chronicling his activities in the war.

Post-First World War activities

Johnston returned from the First World War with a permanent limp, though he continued his activities as a soldier and sportsman. In 1919 Johnston played his final match for Hampshire against Gloucestershire. In his first-class career for Hampshire, Johnston scored 5,442 runs at an average of 30.74, with 27 half centuries, 10 centuries and a high score of 175. Johnston was also a part-time leg break bowler, taking 18 wickets at a bowling average of 44.72, with best figures of 4/21. In the field Johnston took 57 catches and made a single stumping. 

In 1920, Johnston played his second and final first-class match for the Marylebone Cricket Club against the Army and the same season he played his final first-class match for the Gentlemen of England against the Combined Services. In his combined first-class career Johnston played 116 matches, scoring 5,966 runs at an average of 30.91, with 31 half centuries, 10 centuries and a high score of 175. 

All of Johnston's first-class wickets came while he was playing for Hampshire. Johnston continued to play cricket, although in a non-first-class capacity, playing the Netherlands on tours to that country with the Free Foresters and the Marylebone Cricket Club. In 1929/30, Johnston toured Egypt with HM Martineau's XI, where he played matches against the Egypt national cricket team. 

His playing career came to an end with the Free Foresters tour of the Netherlands in 1933. As well as playing cricket, Johnston played for the Army at football and hockey and played polo for Western Nigeria.

Death
Johnston died at Knaphill, Surrey on 27 December 1952.

Family

Johnston's father, Sir Duncan Johnston, was born at Edinburgh in 1847, was a Royal Engineers officer who became Director General of the Ordnance Survey. He also played first-class cricket for Derbyshire during the 1882 season.

References

External links
Alexander Johnston at Cricinfo

1884 births
1952 deaths
Cricketers from Derby
English people of Scottish descent
People educated at Winchester College
Graduates of the Royal Military College, Sandhurst
English cricketers
British Army cricketers
Hampshire cricketers
Marylebone Cricket Club cricketers
Free Foresters cricketers
Worcestershire Regiment officers
Cheshire Regiment officers
Recipients of the Military Cross
Recipients of the Croix de Guerre 1914–1918 (France)
English footballers
English male field hockey players
English polo players
Gentlemen cricketers
British Army generals of World War I
Companions of the Distinguished Service Order
Gentlemen of England cricketers
Association footballers not categorized by position
Military personnel from Derbyshire
British Army brigadiers